Disrupt Degrade & Devastate is a 1999 EP released by Raymond Watts (as PIG). It features two new tracks, "Disrupt Degrade & Devastate" and "Flesh Fest", as well as a remix of each track and live versions of the songs "Everything" and "The Only Good One's a Dead One", both from Wrecked.

Track listing
 "Disrupt Degrade & Devastate" (Raymond Watts, Günter Schulz) – 4:59
 "Flesh Fest" (Watts) – 5:50
 "Disrupt Degrade & Devastate (PIG Remix)" – 5:00
 "Flesh Fest (One True Parker Remix)" – 6:44
 "The Only Good One's a Dead One (Live '99)" (Watts) – 5:35
 "Everything (Live '99)" (Watts, Santos de Castro) – 3:54

Personnel
Raymond Watts
Günter Schulz (1, 3)
Andrew Bennett - additional guitar (2, 4)
Steve White – guitar (5, 6)
Jules Hodgson – guitar (5, 6)
Andy Selway – drums (5, 6)

Pig (musical project) albums
1999 EPs